Taiwanfu may refer to:

 Taiwan Prefecture, a prefecture ruled by the Qing dynasty as a part of Fujian province
 Tainan, known as Taiwanfu when it served as the prefectural capital
 Taichung, known as Taiwanfu when it served as the prefectural capital (1885–1895)
 Zengwen River, formerly known as the Taiwanfu River after adjacent Tainan

See also
 Taiwan (disambiguation)
 Fu (administrative division)